799 Gudula is a minor planet orbiting the Sun discovered by German astronomer Karl Wilhelm Reinmuth on 9 March 1915 at the Heidelberg observatory.

Photometric observations of this asteroid at the Oakley Observatory in Terre Haute, Indiana, during 2006 gave a light curve with a period of 14.814 ± 0.003 hours and a brightness variation of 0.30 ± 0.03 in magnitude.

References

External links
 
 

000799
Discoveries by Karl Wilhelm Reinmuth
Named minor planets
19150309